In chemistry, there are three definitions in common use of the word base, known as Arrhenius bases, Brønsted bases, and Lewis bases. All definitions agree that bases are substances that react with acids, as originally proposed by G.-F. Rouelle in the mid-18th century.

In 1884, Svante Arrhenius proposed that a base is a substance which dissociates in aqueous solution to form hydroxide ions OH−. These ions can react with hydrogen ions (H+ according to Arrhenius) from the dissociation of acids to form water in an acid–base reaction. A base was therefore a metal hydroxide such as NaOH or Ca(OH)2. Such aqueous hydroxide solutions were also described by certain characteristic properties. They are slippery to the touch, can taste bitter and change the color of pH indicators (e.g., turn red litmus paper blue).

In water, by altering the autoionization equilibrium, bases yield solutions in which the hydrogen ion activity is lower than it is in pure water, i.e., the water has a pH higher than 7.0 at standard conditions. A soluble base is called an alkali if it contains and releases OH− ions quantitatively. Metal oxides, hydroxides, and especially alkoxides are basic, and conjugate bases of weak acids are weak bases.

Bases and acids are seen as chemical opposites because the effect of an acid is to increase the hydronium (H3O+) concentration in water, whereas bases reduce this concentration. A reaction between aqueous solutions of an acid and a base is called neutralization, producing a solution of water and a salt in which the salt separates into its component ions. If the aqueous solution is saturated with a given salt solute, any additional such salt precipitates out of the solution.

In the more general Brønsted–Lowry acid–base theory (1923), a base is a substance that can accept hydrogen cations (H+)—otherwise known as protons. This does include aqueous hydroxides since OH− does react with H+ to form water, so that Arrhenius bases are a subset of Brønsted bases. However, there are also other Brønsted bases which accept protons, such as aqueous solutions of ammonia (NH3) or its organic derivatives (amines). These bases do not contain a hydroxide ion but nevertheless react with water, resulting in an increase in the concentration of hydroxide ion. Also, some non-aqueous solvents contain Brønsted bases which react with solvated protons. For example in liquid ammonia, NH2− is the basic ion species which accepts protons from NH4+, the acidic species in this solvent.

G. N. Lewis realized that water, ammonia, and other bases can form a bond with a proton due to the unshared pair of electrons that the bases possess. In the Lewis theory, a base is an electron pair donor which can share a pair of electrons with an electron acceptor which is described as a Lewis acid. The Lewis theory is more general than the Brønsted model because the Lewis acid is not necessarily a proton, but can be another molecule (or ion) with a vacant low-lying orbital which can accept a pair of electrons. One notable example is boron trifluoride (BF3).

Some other definitions of both bases and acids have been proposed in the past, but are not commonly used today.

Properties
General properties of bases include:

Concentrated or strong bases are caustic on organic matter and react violently with acidic substances.
Aqueous solutions or molten bases dissociate in ions and conduct electricity.
Reactions with indicators: bases turn red litmus paper blue, phenolphthalein pink, keep bromothymol blue in its natural colour of blue, and turn methyl orange-yellow.
The pH of a basic solution at standard conditions is greater than seven.
Bases are bitter.

Reactions between bases and water 
The following reaction represents the general reaction between a base (B) and water to produce a conjugate acid (BH+) and a conjugate base (OH−):{B}_{(aq)} + {H2O}_{(l)} <=> {BH+}_{(aq)} + {OH- }_{(aq)}The equilibrium constant, Kb, for this reaction can be found using the following general equation:

 

In this equation, the base (B) and the extremely strong base (the conjugate base OH−) compete for the proton. As a result, bases that react with water have relatively small equilibrium constant values. The base is weaker when it has a lower equilibrium constant value.

Neutralization of acids

Bases react with acids to neutralize each other at a fast rate both in water and in alcohol. When dissolved in water, the strong base sodium hydroxide ionizes into hydroxide and sodium ions:

NaOH -> Na+ + OH-

and similarly, in water the acid hydrogen chloride forms hydronium and chloride ions:

HCl + H2O -> H3O+ + Cl-

H3O+ + OH- -> 2H2O

If equal quantities of NaOH and HCl are dissolved, the base and the acid neutralize exactly, leaving only NaCl, effectively table salt, in solution.

Weak bases, such as baking soda or egg white, should be used to neutralize any acid spills. Neutralizing acid spills with strong bases, such as sodium hydroxide or potassium hydroxide, can cause a violent exothermic reaction, and the base itself can cause just as much damage as the original acid spill.

Alkalinity of non-hydroxides
Bases are generally compounds that can neutralize an amount of acid. Both sodium carbonate and ammonia are bases, although neither of these substances contains  groups. Both compounds accept H+ when dissolved in protic solvents such as water:

Na2CO3 + H2O -> 2Na+ + HCO3- + OH-
NH3 + H2O -> NH4+ + OH-

From this, a pH, or acidity, can be calculated for aqueous solutions of bases.

A base is also defined as a molecule that has the ability to accept an electron pair bond by entering another atom's valence shell through its possession of one electron pair. There are a limited number of elements that have atoms with the ability to provide a molecule with basic properties. Carbon can act as a base as well as nitrogen and oxygen. Fluorine and sometimes rare gases possess this ability as well. This occurs typically in compounds such as butyl lithium, alkoxides, and metal amides such as sodium amide. Bases of carbon, nitrogen and oxygen without resonance stabilization are usually very strong, or superbases, which cannot exist in a water solution due to the acidity of water. Resonance stabilization, however, enables weaker bases such as carboxylates; for example, sodium acetate is a weak base.

Strong bases
A strong base is a basic chemical compound that can remove a proton (H+) from (or deprotonate) a molecule of even a very weak acid (such as water) in an acid–base reaction. Due to their low solubility, some bases, such as alkaline earth hydroxides, can be used when the solubility factor is not taken into account. One advantage of this low solubility is that "many antacids were suspensions of metal hydroxides such as aluminium hydroxide and magnesium hydroxide." These compounds have low solubility and have the ability to stop an increase in the concentration of the hydroxide ion, preventing the harm of the tissues in the mouth, oesophagus, and stomach. As the reaction continues and the salts dissolve, the stomach acid reacts with the hydroxide produced by the suspensions. Strong bases hydrolyze in water almost completely, resulting in the leveling effect." In this process, the water molecule combines with a strong base, due to the water's amphoteric ability; and, a hydroxide ion is released. Very strong bases can even deprotonate very weakly acidic C–H groups in the absence of water. Here is a list of several strong bases:

The cations of these strong bases appear in the first and second groups of the periodic table (alkali and earth alkali metals). Tetraalkylated ammonium hydroxides are also strong bases since they dissociate completely in water. Guanidine is a special case of a species that is exceptionally stable when protonated, analogously to the reason that makes perchloric acid and sulfuric acid very strong acids.

Acids with a pKa of more than about 13 are considered very weak, and their conjugate bases are strong bases.

Superbases

Group 1 salts of carbanions, amide ions, and hydrides tend to be even stronger bases due to the extreme weakness of their conjugate acids, which are stable hydrocarbons, amines, and dihydrogen. Usually, these bases are created by adding pure alkali metals such as sodium into the conjugate acid. They are called superbases, and it is impossible to keep them in aqueous solutions because they are stronger bases than the hydroxide ion (See the leveling effect.) For example, the ethoxide ion (conjugate base of ethanol) undergoes this reaction quantitatively in presence of water.

CH3CH2O- + H2O -> CH3CH2OH + OH-

Examples of common superbases are:
Butyl lithium (n-C4H9Li)
Lithium diisopropylamide (LDA) [(CH3)2CH]2NLi 
Lithium diethylamide (LDEA)  
Sodium amide (NaNH2)
Sodium hydride (NaH)
Lithium bis(trimethylsilyl)amide 

Strongest superbases are synthesised in only gas phase:
Ortho-diethynylbenzene dianion (C6H4(C2)2)2− (This is the strongest superbase ever synthesized)  
Meta-diethynylbenzene dianion (C6H4(C2)2)2− (second strongest superbase)
Para-diethynylbenzene dianion (C6H4(C2)2)2− (third strongest superbase)
Lithium monoxide anion (LiO−) was considered the strongest superbase before diethynylbenzene dianions were created.

Weak bases 

A weak base is one which does not fully ionize in an aqueous solution, or in which protonation is incomplete. For example, ammonia transfers a proton to water according to the equation

The equilibrium constant for this reaction at 25 °C is 1.8 x 10−5, such that the extent of reaction or degree of ionization is quite small.

Lewis bases 
A Lewis base or electron-pair donor is a molecule with one or more high-energy lone pairs of electrons which can be shared with a low-energy vacant orbital in an acceptor molecule to form an adduct. In addition to H+, possible electron-pair acceptors (Lewis acids) include neutral molecules such as BF3 and high oxidation state metal ions such as Ag2+, Fe3+ and Mn7+. Adducts involving metal ions are usually described as coordination complexes.

According to the original formulation of Lewis, when a neutral base forms a bond with a neutral acid, a condition of electric stress occurs. The acid and the base share the electron pair that formerly belonged to the base. As a result, a high dipole moment is created, which can only be decreased to zero by rearranging the molecules.

Solid bases 
Examples of solid bases include:
 Oxide mixtures: SiO2, Al2O3; MgO, SiO2; CaO, SiO2
 Mounted bases: LiCO3 on silica; NR3, NH3, KNH2 on alumina; NaOH, KOH mounted on silica on alumina
 Inorganic chemicals: BaO, KNaCO3, BeO, MgO, CaO, KCN
 Anion exchange resins
Charcoal that has been treated at 900 degrees Celsius or activates with N2O, NH3, ZnCl2-NH4Cl-CO2

Depending on a solid surface's ability to successfully form a conjugate base by absorbing an electrically neutral acid, basic strength of the surface is determined. The "number of basic sites per unit surface area of the solid" is used to express how much basic strength is found on a solid base catalyst. Scientists have developed two methods to measure the amount of basic sites: one, titration with benzoic acid using indicators and gaseous acid adsorption. A solid with enough basic strength will absorb an electrically neutral acidic indicator and cause the acidic indicator's color to change to the color of its conjugate base. When performing the gaseous acid adsorption method, nitric oxide is used. The basic sites are then determined by calculating the amount of carbon dioxide that is absorbed.

Bases as catalysts
Basic substances can be used as insoluble heterogeneous catalysts for chemical reactions. Some examples are metal oxides such as magnesium oxide, calcium oxide, and barium oxide as well as potassium fluoride on alumina and some zeolites. Many transition metals make good catalysts, many of which form basic substances. Basic catalysts are used for hydrogenation, the migration of double bonds, in the Meerwein-Ponndorf-Verley reduction, the Michael reaction, and many others. Both CaO and BaO can be highly active catalysts if they are heated to high temperatures.

Uses of bases
Sodium hydroxide is used in the manufacture of soap, paper, and the synthetic fiber rayon.
Calcium hydroxide (slaked lime) is used in the manufacture of bleaching powder.
Calcium hydroxide is also used to clean the sulfur dioxide, which is caused by the exhaust, that is found in power plants and factories.
Magnesium hydroxide is used as an 'antacid' to neutralize excess acid in the stomach and cure indigestion.
Sodium carbonate is used as washing soda and for softening hard water.
Sodium bicarbonate (or sodium hydrogen carbonate) is used as baking soda in cooking food, for making baking powders, as an antacid to cure indigestion and in soda acid fire extinguisher.
Ammonium hydroxide is used to remove grease stains from clothes

Monoprotic and polyprotic bases 
Bases with only one ionizable hydroxide (OH−) ion per formula unit are called monoprotic since they can accept one proton (H+). Bases with more than one OH- per formula unit are polyprotic.

The number of ionizable hydroxide (OH−) ions present in one formula unit of a base is also called the acidity of the base. On the basis of acidity bases can be classified into three types: monoacidic, diacidic and triacidic.

Monoacidic bases 

When one molecule of a base via complete ionization produces one hydroxide ion, the base is said to be a monoacidic or monoprotic base. Examples of monoacidic bases are:

Sodium hydroxide, potassium hydroxide, silver hydroxide, ammonium hydroxide, etc

Diacidic bases 
When one molecule of base via complete ionization produces two hydroxide ions, the base is said to be diacidic or diprotic. Examples of diacidic bases are:

Barium hydroxide, magnesium hydroxide, calcium hydroxide, zinc hydroxide, iron(II) hydroxide, tin(II) hydroxide, lead(II) hydroxide, copper(II) hydroxide, etc.

Triacidic bases 
When one molecule of base via complete ionization produces three hydroxide ions, the base is said to be triacidic or triprotic. Examples of triacidic bases are:

Aluminium hydroxide, ferrous hydroxide, Gold Trihydroxide,

Etymology of the term
The concept of base stems from an older alchemical notion of "the matrix":

See also

Acids
Acid–base reactions
Base-richness (used in ecology, referring to environments)
Conjugate base
Lewis acids and bases
Titration

References

Chemical compounds